Joshua Cohen (born August 18, 1992) is an American professional soccer player who plays as a goalkeeper for Israeli Premier League club Maccabi Haifa.

Cohen is also an Israeli citizen.

Early and personal life
Cohen was born in Mountain View, California, United States, to a family of Jewish descent.

On December 12, 2019, he obtained his Israeli temporary resident status. On February 20, 2021, Cohen acquired Israeli citizenship, with an Oleh Hadash status, on account of the State of Israel's Law of Return for the Jewish diaspora.

Club career 
Cohen played four years of college soccer at the University of California, San Diego between 2010 and 2013, graduating with a degree in bioengineering and computer science. He appeared in 51 games in his collegiate career. In 2012, he started 12 games and led the entirety of NCAA Division II in goals against average (0.397) and save percentage (0.898), earning a place on the Daktronics All-America Second Team. In 2013, he started 22 games and earned NSCAA All-America First Team honors.

In early 2014, Cohen was invited by the Philadelphia Union to a one-week trial from January 25 through February 1.

Burlingame Dragons 
After college, Cohen appeared for USL PDL side Burlingame Dragons in 2015, making 11 appearances with a goals against average of 0.636.

Orange County 
Cohen signed with United Soccer League club Orange County Blues on August 10, 2015, where he started one game in the 2015 season. He returned to the team for the 2016 season.

Phoenix Rising 
Cohen spent the 2017 season with Phoenix Rising where he won the starting goalkeeper role, making 28 starts on the season. He earned the September 2017 Player of the Month Award with a 0.37 GAA and 88.9% save percentage over the course of the month.

Sacramento Republic 
Cohen signed with Sacramento Republic FC of the USL Championship on January 16, 2018, with a club option for 2019. He played every minute of the 2018 USL Championship season, conceding 32 goals in the 34 games of the regular season, and earning twelve clean sheets. Cohen was named a finalist for USL Goalkeeper of the Year and was selected to the USL All-League Second Team.

He returned to Sacramento for the start of the 2019 season and made 16 appearances, allowing just 17 goals, before his transfer.

Maccabi Haifa 
On July 19, 2019, Sacramento Republic and Maccabi Haifa agreed to a transfer of Cohen to the Israeli Premier League club in advance of their 2019–20 season. Cohen made his first start on September 25, 2019, where he was in net for a 3–0 victory over Maccabi Netanya. He returned to the starting line-up on October 26, 2019, for another 3–0 victory, this time over Hapoel Kfar Saba. He then started every game until the season's eventual postponement. In that time, he conceded only 15 goals in his 21 games, saw out 12 clean sheets, and helped lead Maccabi Haifa to a second-place finish at the end of the first stage of the regular season.

Cohen was named the Israeli Premier League's Player of the Season in 2020–21, leading Maccabi Haifa to their first league championship since their last one in 2010–11.

Honors
Maccabi Haifa
 Israeli Premier League: 2020–21, 2021–22
 Israel Toto Cup (Ligat Ha'Al): 2021–22
 Israel Super Cup: 2021

Individual
 Israeli Footballer of the Year: 2020–21

See also 

 List of Jewish footballers
 List of Jews in sports
 List of Israelis

References

External links

 

1992 births
Living people
American soccer players
Association football goalkeepers
UC San Diego Tritons men's soccer players
Burlingame Dragons FC players
Orange County SC players
Phoenix Rising FC players
Sacramento Republic FC players
Maccabi Haifa F.C. players
USL League Two players
Israeli Premier League players
People from Mountain View, California
Soccer players from California
Sportspeople from Santa Clara County, California
American people of Jewish descent
American Israel Public Affairs Committee
Israeli American
Israeli people of American-Jewish descent
American people of Israeli descent
Israeli people of Jewish descent
Israeli footballers
Jewish footballers
American emigrants to Israel
Citizens of Israel through Law of Return
Israeli Footballer of the Year recipients